The 2006 BBL Champions Cup was the first edition of the super cup game in German basketball, and was played on September 21, 2006.

Match

References

BBL Champions Cup
Champions Cup